NA-176 (Muzaffargarh-I) was a constituency for the National Assembly of Pakistan. It comprised mainly areas of Muzaffargarh Tehsil and Kot Addu Tehsil. After the 2018 delimitations, this constituency, along with its neighboring NA-177, were broken up into three constituencies - NA-181, NA-182 (which also includes city of Muzaffargarh from old NA-178), and NA-183.

Election 2002 

General elections were held on 10 Oct 2002. Mrs Khalida Mohsin Ali Qurishi of PPP won by 58,947 votes.

Election 2008 

General elections were held on 18 Feb 2008. Muhammad Mohsin Ali Qureshi of PPP won by 50,826 votes.

Election 2013 

General elections were held on 11 May 2013. Malik Sultan Mehmood Hanjra of PML-N won by 88,322 votes and became the  member of National Assembly.

References

External links 
Election result's official website

NA-176
Abolished National Assembly Constituencies of Pakistan

Constituencies of Muzaffargarh
Politics of Muzaffargarh
Constituencies of Pakistan